Felix Ua Ruanada was the third Archbishop of Tuam, Ireland, 1201–1235.

The History of the Popes describes him as:

a Cistercian Monk, uncle of Roderic O'Conor, King of Ireland ... In 1235 he resigned his charge, and retired to St. Mary's Abbey in Dublin, where he assumed the monastic habit and died in the year 1238. His episcopal seal in engraved in Harris's Ware.

References

External links
Annals of the Four Masters

Archbishops of Tuam
Medieval Gaels from Ireland
People from County Galway
13th-century Roman Catholic archbishops in Ireland
1238 deaths
Year of birth unknown